Anthony "Tony" Diagne (born 7 September 1990) is a French footballer who plays as a defender.

Career
Born in Aubergenville, Yvelines, Diagne started his career playing in the youth teams at Nottingham Forest. On 2 June 2010 he was released by Forest and went back to France to play for his local side Aubervilliers in the Championnat de France amateur.

He stayed there for half a year until in January 2011 he was signed by Football League Two side Macclesfield Town. He made his debut for Macclesfield on 1 February 2011 in a 4–2 defeat to Bury, coming on as a second-half substitute. He scored his first goal just eight days later in a 2–2 draw with Hereford United. Diagne initially signed a contract to the end of the 2010–11 season but after a series of good performances in defence that contract was extended to the end of the 2011–12 season.

After impressing in a relegation threatened side, in April 2012, Diagne was linked with a move to Leeds United and Blackburn Rovers at the end of the season.

At the end of August 2012 Diagne was due to sign for League One club Bury on loan with a view to making the move permanent in January. But the deal fell through and he stayed with Macclesfield. On 3 November 2012, Diagne scored a long range free kick from around 40 yards out against Swindon Town in the FA Cup where Macclesfield Town famously defeated Paulo Di Canio's Swindon Town side 2–0 at the County Ground.

It was announced on 2 March 2013 that Diagne was rejoining former Macclesfield manager Gary Simpson at Lincoln City on loan, he joined the imps till the end of the season accompanied by former Imp and then Macclesfield captain Nat Brown. Despite borrowing two of the Silkmen's defenders Lincoln conceded within two minutes of their Conference National match against Woking, which took place on the same day as Diagne signed for Lincoln, the match finished 1–1. The next match for Diagne's Lincoln was away at Macclesfield on the following Wednesday, as a part of the loan deal Diagne and Brown were not eligible to play in the match.

At the end of the season Diagne left Macclesfield and joined nearby Football League side Morecambe on a two-year contract. Manager Jim Bentley was impressed with Diagne's ability to adapt to different positions.

On 6 May 2014 it was announced that Diagne had been put on the transfer list at the Globe Arena.

Career statistics

Footnotes

A.  The "Other" column constitutes appearances and goals (including those as a substitute) in the Football League and Football Conference.
B.  The "Other" column constitutes appearances and goals (including those as a substitute) in the Football League Trophy.

References

External links

1990 births
Living people
Footballers from Yvelines
French footballers
Association football defenders
Macclesfield Town F.C. players
Lincoln City F.C. players
English Football League players
National League (English football) players
FCM Aubervilliers players
Hemel Hempstead Town F.C. players
Barrow A.F.C. players
Morecambe F.C. players
AC Boulogne-Billancourt players